John Kirkby may refer to:

 John Kirkby (bishop of Ely) (died 1290)
 John Kirkby (bishop of Carlisle) (died 1352)
 John Kirkby (footballer) (1929–1953) American soccer player
 John Kirkby (MP) for Hampshire (UK Parliament constituency)

See also
 John Kirby (disambiguation)